This is a list of U.S. states and territories by carbon dioxide emissions due to human activity. The data presented below are energy-related greenhouse emissions (CO2 equivalent) only, published by the U.S. Energy Information Administration (2017 data). These data do not include emissions from other activity such as agriculture, industrial processes, or waste management.

The Northern Mariana Islands is not ranked in the table below because there is no data for that territory. The Northern Mariana Islands is the only state/territory with no carbon dioxide emissions data.

The jurisdiction with the highest total carbon dioxide emissions is Texas, and the jurisdiction with the lowest total carbon dioxide emissions is American Samoa. The region with the highest per capita carbon dioxide emissions is Wyoming, and the jurisdiction with the lowest per capita carbon dioxide emissions is the District of Columbia.

Table

Source for territories (population): CIA World Factbook (2017 web.archive.org captures) for 2017 populations, plus 2019 versions of the CIA World Factbook which contain 2017 carbon dioxide data for four of the five territories

See also 
 Greenhouse gas emissions by the United States
 Climate change
 Comparisons of life-cycle greenhouse gas emissions
 List of countries by carbon dioxide emissions
 List of countries by greenhouse gas emissions
 List of countries by carbon dioxide emissions per capita
 List of countries by greenhouse gas emissions per capita
 Top contributors to greenhouse gas emissions

Notes

General
 The 'States and D.C. Total' value represents the sum of  emissions from the 50 U.S. states plus the District of Columbia. This value differs from total U.S. CO2 emissions from fossil fuel combustion reported in the Inventory of U.S. Greenhouse Gas Emissions and Sinks. The U.S. inventory value is larger because it includes emissions from U.S. territories and possessions; it also uses a different approach for estimating emissions from non-energy uses of fossil fuels (which are not included in the combustion-related values shown in this table).
 Nationally, CO2 emissions from fossil fuel combustion represented the largest source (76%) of total GWP–weighted emissions from all emission sources in 2014. Similarly, CO2 emissions from fossil fuel combustion are the largest source of greenhouse gas emissions within a state.
Numbers for territories include only fossil fuel numbers — they do not include petroleum, natural gas, and coal numbers.

Specific

References

External links

EPA website
Energy CO2 Emissions by State
Energy-Related Carbon Dioxide Emissions by State, 2000-2015
Interactive graphs and maps of the 2014 data on Tableau Public
Tableau Public Chart of the 2014 data on Tableau Public
An interactive visualization of the CO2 emissions for each state based on this data

Climate change in the United States
Carbon dioxide emissions
U.S.
Greenhouse gas emissions in the United States
Carbon dioxide
United States, carbon dioxide emissions